The Perfect Weapon is a 1991 martial arts action film directed by Mark DiSalle and starring Jeff Speakman, Mako Iwamatsu, James Hong, and Cary-Hiroyuki Tagawa. Set in Los Angeles, the film relates the story of a young man (Speakman), who is trained in the martial art of American Kenpo, and his fight against the Korean mafia.

Speakman was a student of and was advised closely by Ed Parker in the making of this film.

The film's taglines included "No gun. No knife. No equal." and "Just try him." and is the only well-known Hollywood depiction of Kenpo techniques on-screen.

The hit 1990s song "The Power" by Eurodance rap group Snap! is featured extensively in the movie's soundtrack.

Plot
Jeff Sanders (Jeff Speakman) leads a double life of sorts: by day, he is a simple, unassuming construction worker, and by night, an expert Kenpo student and master of his craft.

Jeff's background is revealed; after losing his mother as a child, he became an outcast and frequently lashed out at his family and society in an attempt to assuage his anger. His father, Captain Sanders (Beau Starr), gained the idea from a mutual friend, Kim (Mako), to enroll Jeff in a Kenpō school to better manage his rage and feelings. However, he lost his temper with a football player who punched his younger brother, and almost kills him. Displeased with this event, Jeff's father forced him to move out of their home. Jeff, now estranged from his family and living alone, continued with his courses in Kenpo and eventually adopted Kim as a mentor and father figure.

Jeff decides to return to his old neighborhood to visit Kim. Inside his shop, Kim is having trouble with local Korean mafia families, due to his refusal to pay them off and use his antique store to peddle drugs. Jeff helps out Kim and beats up the henchmen who attacked his store. A mysterious hulking hitman named Tanaka (Professor Tanaka) appears and kills the lead henchman due to his failure to force Kim to comply by head-butting him. He later kills Kim in the same manner and although Jeff tries to chase him down, Tanaka escapes.

Jeff vows to avenge Kim's death and is determined to find out who ordered Kim's murder. He remembers a boy named Jimmy (Dante Basco) who lived with Kim and tries to find him to ask if he knows about the murder. However, Jeff's estranged younger brother Adam (John Dye), now a cop, is investigating the case, and warns Jeff against trying to take matters into his own hands. In his hunt, Jeff is approached by a mafia boss named Yung (James Hong) who claims to be Kim's friend and points him to a fellow mafia boss named Sam. However, upon breaking into Sam's residence and attempting to kill him, Jimmy appears and reveals that Sam was one of Kim's closest friends and was the one who took him in for protection. Jimmy also clarifies that Yung is the one responsible for Kim's death, and was merely attempting to use Jeff as a pawn to kill his rival boss Sam.

Jeff now plans to kill Yung, but Jimmy warns him that Yung is always protected by his hit-man Tanaka. In order to get Tanaka out of the equation, Jeff asks Jimmy to falsely testify to Adam that he witnessed Tanaka murdering Kim. Jeff has plotted to have Adam arrest Tanaka so that Jeff can get Yung alone to kill him. Adam and the police eventually capture Tanaka after a long car chase, but to Jeff's dismay Yung was absent from the car. Tanaka is knocked out with a taser, but later manages to escape from the police, breaking out of the police car and injuring Adam and his colleague in the process.

Jimmy overhears that Yung plans to escape the country by boat and tells Jeff about Yung's drug factory. Now in a bigger hurry, Jeff sets out to attack Yung's drug factory, using his martial arts skills and various weapons to defeat the guards and employees protecting Yung. He eventually subdues Yung, but is attacked by Tanaka. Although Tanaka dominates most of the fight, Jeff manages to kill Tanaka by setting him aflame when he is next to a gas tank. Despite initially wanting to kill Yung, Jeff decides to capture him alive (showing he has learned self-control) and turns Yung in to his father, Captain Sanders.

Later Jeff enters the kenpo dojo to visit his former master and a former fellow student.

Cast
 Jeff Speakman as Jeff Sanders
 John Dye as Detective Adam Sanders
 Mako as Kim
 James Hong as Yung
 Mariska Hargitay as Jennifer
 Dante Basco as Jimmy Ho
 Professor Tanaka as Tanaka
 Seth Sakai as Master Lo
 Beau Starr as Captain Carl Sanders
 Clyde Kusatsu as Detective Wong
 Cary-Hiroyuki Tagawa as Kai

Box office
The Perfect Weapon debuted at the box office at number six with a three-day box-office take of $3.9 million and had a total domestic box office gross of $14,061,361.

Reception
The film was met with mixed reviews. Kevin Thomas of the Los Angeles Times wrote that the film "moves well, and its many action and martial sequences are crisply staged. But unless you are a die-hard martial-arts fan, be prepared to be thoroughly bored by such a strictly by-the-numbers plot." Rita Kemply wrote in The Washington Post that "Speakman, who studied under grand master Ed Parker, is introducing not only himself but the kenpo form to the screen. A fourth-degree black belt, he performs his own stunts, and that's important, as The Perfect Weapon is basically one long stunt." Stephen Holden of The New York Times described it as "a macho fantasy of physical control, grace and invincibility in which women are all but absent", adding:  On Rotten Tomatoes, it has a 42% approval rating based on 12 reviews.

Home media
The Perfect Weapon was released on February 14, 2012 on DVD and Blu-ray Disc.

TV Version
On TV airings, deleted scenes involving Jennifer, Mariska Hargitay's character, were added back into the film.

References

External links
 
 

1991 films
1991 action films
American martial arts films
American action films
Films scored by Gary Chang
Films set in Los Angeles
Films shot in Los Angeles
Karate films
1991 martial arts films
Paramount Pictures films
1990s English-language films
1990s American films